MOVE IT is the world's biggest dance event, taking place over three days annually at ExCeL, London.

History
MOVE IT was first held in London in 2005, the creation of Georgina Harper. The show was initially put on by Jonathan Scott/Value Added Events Ltd. In 2007, the show was bought by Upper Street Events and is now part of the live events portfolio of Immediate Media.

Program and Features
The creative program includes over 100 main stage performances, 160 dance classes, a freestyle stage, dance competitions, and auditions, and in 2023 hosts the UK Hip Hop Dance Championships.
 MOVE IT hosts exhibitors including UK, European and international dance retailers, plus womenswear and sportswear retailers.
 The freestyle stage allows anyone attending to demonstrate their dancing skills in front of the public.
 The main stage holds performances by dance companies, dance schools and professionals. Performers past and present include: Flawless, Layton Williams, and Tasha Ghouri of Love Island.
 Auditions are held every year for professional dancers. Past and present auditions include: Disneyland Resort Paris, Cirque du Soleil, and in 2023, Royal Caribbean Cruises.

Awards
MOVE IT won an Association of Event Organisers (AEO) Excellence Award for best Best Consumer Show under 2000 square metres for the 2009 event.

References

External links
 Official website

Trade fairs in the United Kingdom
Dance events
Dance in the United Kingdom